

Canadian Football News in 1930
The Winnipeg Rugby Club was formed on May 14 at the annual meeting of the MRFU. The team played as the Winnipegs and adopted the colours of green and white.

On September 29 in the first game played in Canada under floodlights, the Hamilton Tigers defeated the University of British Columbia in an exhibition game at Athletic Park.

The first game in Eastern Canada under floodlights was on October 29 between Oshawa and Toronto Balmy Beach in Toronto's Ulster Stadium.

The convert kicking spot was moved from the 35-line to the 25 but only drop kicks were allowed.

Regular season

Final regular season standings
Note: GP = Games Played, W = Wins, L = Losses, T = Ties, PF = Points For, PA = Points Against, Pts = Points
*Bold text means that they have clinched the playoffs.

League Champions

Grey Cup playoffs
Note: All dates in 1930

ORFU final

Sarnia advances to the East Semifinal.

East semifinal

Hamilton advances to the East Final.

East final

Toronto advances to the Grey Cup game.

West quarterfinal

Regina will play Calgary.

West semifinal

Regina advances to the Western Final.

Western Finals

Regina won the total-point series by 21-0. Regina advances to the Grey Cup game.

Playoff bracket

Grey Cup Championship

1930 Canadian Football Awards
 Jeff Russel Memorial Trophy (IRFU MVP) – Frank Turville (RB), Toronto Argonauts

References

 
Canadian Football League seasons